The 1954 Grand Prix motorcycle racing season was the sixth F.I.M. Road Racing World Championship Grand Prix season. The season consisted of nine Grand Prix races in five classes: 500cc, 350cc, 250cc, 125cc and Sidecars 500cc. It began on 30 May, with French Grand Prix and ended with Spanish Grand Prix on 3 October.

1954 Grand Prix season calendar

† The 500 cc race was stopped by bad weather, and the FIM excluded the race from the World Championship.

†† The Sidecars and 125cc races were held on the 10.6-mile (17.364) km long Clypse Course other than the usual 37 mile (62 km) Snaefell mountain course.

Standings

Scoring system
Points were awarded to the top six finishers in each race. Only the four best races counted in the Sidecars, 125cc and 250cc, while in the 350cc and 500cc championships, the five best results were counted.

500cc final standings

350cc Standings

250cc Standings

125cc Standings

References
 Büla, Maurice & Schertenleib, Jean-Claude (2001). Continental Circus 1949–2000. Chronosports S.A. 

Grand Prix motorcycle racing seasons
Grand Prix motorcycle racing season